Bashkimi is a journal published in Albania. It is the organ of the Reorganised Party of Labour of Albania (PPSHR).

References

Party newspapers published in Albania
Communist newspapers
Albanian-language newspapers
Mass media in Tirana